Gabe Latigue (born October 11, 1990) is an American soccer player.

Background 
Latigue graduated from Panther Creek High School in Cary, North Carolina.

Career

College
Latigue spent his entire college career at Elon University.  In 2009, he made 20 appearances as a true freshman and recorded two assists, including one in a 2-0 SoCon Tournament semifinal win over College of Charleston.  In 2010, he made 19 appearances and recorded six goals and two assists.  In 2011, he made 22 appearances and finished with four goals and seven assists and was named to the SoCon All-Tournament Team.  In his senior year in 2012, he made 21 appearances and finished with five goals and six assists.

Professional
On January 22, 2013, Latigue was drafted in the fourth round (61st overall) of the 2013 MLS Supplemental Draft by New England Revolution.  After an impressive preseason, he signed a contract with the club on March 1.

On March 27, 2013, Latigue was loaned to USL Pro affiliate Rochester Rhinos for the 2013 season.  He made his Rhinos debut on April 13 in a 3-0 loss to VSI Tampa Bay FC.

He was waived following the 2013 season.

References

External links
 
 Elon University bio
 

1990 births
Living people
American soccer players
Association football midfielders
Elon Phoenix men's soccer players
New England Revolution draft picks
New England Revolution players
North American Soccer League players
North Carolina FC players
People from Apex, North Carolina
Rochester New York FC players
Soccer players from Mississippi
Soccer players from North Carolina
USL Championship players